The Ottawa Renegades played in the CFL for 4 seasons, between 2002 and 2006. They were the second Canadian Football League team to make Ottawa their home, following the Ottawa Rough Riders and preceding the Ottawa Redblacks.

Scoring 

Most points – Career
277 – Lawrence Tynes
208 - Josh Ranek

Most Points – Season
198 – Lawrence Tynes – 2003
115 - Matt Kellett - 2005

Most Touchdowns – Career
33 – Josh Ranek
19 - Kerry Joseph

Most Touchdowns – Season
11 – Josh Ranek – 2003

Passing 

Most Passing Yards – Career
10,962 – Kerry Joseph
3,177 – Dan Crowley

Most Passing Yards – Season
4466 – Kerry Joseph - 2005
3698 – Kerry Joseph - 2003
2762 – Kerry Joseph - 2004
2697 – Dan Crowley - 2002

Most Passing Yards – Game
436 - Kerry Joseph - 2004

Most Passing Touchdowns – Career
57 – Kerry Joseph
18 – Dan Crowley

Most Passing Touchdowns – Season
25 – Kerry Joseph - 2005
19 – Kerry Joseph - 2003
16 – Dan Crowley - 2002

Most Passing Touchdowns – Game
3 - Dan Crowley - 2002
3 – Kerry Joseph - 2005
3 – Kerry Joseph - 2004

Rushing 

Most Rushing Yards – Career
4,028 – Josh Ranek
2,004 – Kerry Joseph
545 - Darren Davis

Most Rushing Yards – Season (all 1000 yard rushers included)
1157 – Josh Ranek – 2005
1122 – Josh Ranek – 2003
1060 - Josh Ranek - 2004
1006 – Kerry Joseph - 2005

Most Rushing Yards – Game
164 - Josh Ranek - 2005

Receiving 

Most Receiving Yards – Career
2,252 – Josh Ranek
2,114 - Yo Murphy
1,915 - Jason Armstead
1,253 - Demetrius Bendross
1,004 - Jimmy Oliver
1,000 - D.J. Flick
994 - Denis Montana
860 – Pat Woodcock

Most Receiving Yards – Season
1307 - Jason Armstead - 2005
1090 - Yo Murphy - 2004
1004 – Jimmy Oliver – 2002

Most Receiving Yards – Game
184 - Yo Murphy - 2004
173 - Jason Armstead - 2005

Most Receptions – Career
225 – Josh Ranek
137 - Yo Murphy
130 - Jason Armstead
88 - Demetrius Bendross
82 - Jimmy Oliver
74 - Denis Montana
64 - D.J. Flick
64 – Pat Woodcock

Most Receptions – Season
89 - Jason Armstead - 2005
82 - Jimmy Oliver - 2002
76 – Josh Ranek - 2005
61 - Yo Murphy - 2004
60 - D.J. Flick - 2003

Most Receptions – Game
11 - Josh Ranek - 2005

Interceptions 

Most Interceptions – Career
10 – Korey Banks
6 - Crance Clemons
5 - Gerald Vaughn
5 - Kyries Hebert
4 - Alfonso Roundtree
4 - John Grace
4 - Serge Sejour

Most Interceptions – Season
10 – Korey Banks – 2005
4 - Alfonso Roundtree - 2002

Most Interceptions – Game
3 - Kyries Hebert - 2005

Quarterback sacks 

Most Sacks – Career
17 - Jerome Haywood

Most Sacks – Season
12 – Anthony Collier – 2005
8 – Derrick Ford – 2002
7 – Keaton Cromartie – 2003
7 – Fred Perry – 2003

Most Sacks – Game
5 – Anthony Collier – 2005

Defensive tackles 

Most defensive tackles – Career
241 - Kelly Wiltshire

Most defensive tackles – Season
86 - Kelly Wiltshire - 2002
79 - Kelly Wiltshire - 2003
76 - Kelly Wiltshire - 2004
74 - John Grace - 2003
69 - Donovan Carter - 2002
66 - John Grace - 2002
66 - Kyries Hebert - 2005
62 - Gerald Vaughn - 2002
62 - Donovan Carter - 2003

Special team tackles 

Special team tackles – Career
56 - Kyries Hebert

Special team tackles – Season
29 – Kyries Hebert – 2005
27 – Kyries Hebert – 2004
19 – Mike Vilimek – 2004
18 – Tim Fleiszer – 2003

References 

CFL Record Book 2009
CFL website

Ottawa Renegades
Canadian Football League records and statistics
Ontario sport-related lists
Redblacks